Raymond Vautherin (La Thuile, 18 September 1935 – Aymavilles, 11 February 2018) was a French-speaking Italian linguist, poet and playwright. He wrote plays and poetry in Valdôtain dialect.

Early life
Raymond Vautherin was born on 18 September 1935 in La Thuile. After his father died, he moved to Pont d'Aël, Aymavilles.

Career
Vautherin wrote poetry in Valdôtain dialect, locally called patois, from the Aosta Valley. As a member of the Comité des Traditions Valdôtaines, he authored several plays in this patois and revived Charaban, the local theatre company in patois. He also translated the Book of Proverbs and The Little Prince into patois. From 1975 to his death, he was the editor-in-chief of Lo Flambò, the official magazine of the committee.

He was also a member of the Valdotainian academic society Académie Saint-Anselme.

Death
Vautherin died on 11 February 2018 in Aymavilles.

Selected works
Adjeu poésia (1957)
Lo Cardeleun (1959)

References

1935 births
2018 deaths
People from Savoie
People from Aosta Valley
French emigrants to Italy
Linguists from France
Linguists from Italy
20th-century French dramatists and playwrights
21st-century French dramatists and playwrights
20th-century Italian dramatists and playwrights
Italian dramatists and playwrights